As Joias da Coroa is a novel written by the Brazilian writer Raul Pompeia. It was first published in 1882. It has been published in Portuguese and Italian.

External links

 As Joias da Coroa, the book

1882 Brazilian novels
Joias